Ballinamallard railway station served Ballinamallard in  County Fermanagh in Northern Ireland.

The Londonderry and Enniskillen Railway opened the station on 19 August 1854. It was taken over by the Great Northern Railway (Ireland) in 1883.

It closed on 1 October 1957.

References

Disused railway stations in County Fermanagh
Railway stations opened in 1854
Railway stations closed in 1957
1854 establishments in Ireland
1957 disestablishments in Northern Ireland
Railway stations in Northern Ireland opened in the 19th century